The XVII Memorial of Hubert Jerzy Wagner was a volleyball tournament held at Tauron Arena in Kraków, Poland from 1 to 3 August 2019. Like the previous editions, 4 teams participated in the tournament.

Qualification
All teams except the host must have received an invitation from the organizers.

Venue

Results
All times are local Central European Summer Time (UTC+2).

Ranking

|}

|}

Final standing

Awards

Most Valuable Player
  Yoandy Leal
Best Setter
  Fabian Drzyzga
Best Server
  Wallace de Souza
Best Receiver
  Maurício Borges Silva

Best Blocker
  Karol Kłos
Best Opposite Spiker
  Dawid Konarski
Best Libero
  Lauri Kerminen

References

External links
Official website

Memorial of Hubert Jerzy Wagner
Sports competitions in Kraków
Memorial of Hubert Jerzy Wagner
Memorial of Hubert Jerzy Wagner
Memorial of Hubert Jerzy Wagner
21st century in Kraków
International volleyball competitions hosted by Poland